Russell A. Anderson (May 28, 1942 – September 15, 2020) was an attorney who served as Chief Justice of the Minnesota Supreme Court. He served as an associate justice of the court from September 1, 1998 until he was sworn in as chief justice on January 10, 2006. He retired from the Supreme Court on June 1, 2008, at age 66, and was succeeded by Eric J. Magnuson.

Anderson died in September 2020 at the age of 78.

Early life and education
Anderson graduated from St. Olaf College in Northfield in 1964, then went on to the University of Minnesota Law School in Minneapolis, earning his J.D. in 1968. He later attended George Washington University in Washington, D.C., earning his Master of Laws degree in 1977.

Career
His first legal experience came while in military service. Lieutenant Commander Anderson served in the Judge Advocate General's Corps of the U.S. Navy. He acted as prosecutor and defense attorney for general and lesser courts-martial, as military judge for special and summary court-martial, and as civil and criminal staff attorney in the Office of Judge Advocate General, Washington, D.C. He was in private practice in Bemidji from 1976 to 1982. He was the Beltrami County Attorney from 1978 to 1982. Anderson had worked as judge on the Ninth District Court since 1983, having been appointed by Governor Al Quie. He was named to the state's high court in 1998 by Governor Arne Carlson.

References

External links
Minnesota Public Radio Article 3/10/2008: "Minnesota Chief Justice Russell Anderson to retire"
Governor's Office News Release 12/2005: "Pawlenty names Russell Anderson Chief Justice of Supreme Court"

1942 births
2020 deaths
People from Bemidji, Minnesota
Military personnel from Minnesota
St. Olaf College alumni
University of Minnesota Law School alumni
Chief Justices of the Minnesota Supreme Court
Minnesota state court judges
George Washington University Law School alumni
United States Navy Judge Advocate General's Corps